Li Wenkai (born 27 August 1969) is a Chinese former cyclist. He competed in two events at the 1992 Summer Olympics.

References

1969 births
Living people
Chinese male cyclists
Olympic cyclists of China
Cyclists at the 1992 Summer Olympics
Place of birth missing (living people)
20th-century Chinese people